Best Latin Jazz Album may refer to one of the following:

Grammy Award for Best Latin Jazz Album
Latin Grammy Award for Best Latin Jazz Album